Lars Erik Tirén (27 July 1901 – 14 September 1980) was a Swedish athlete. He competed in the men's pole vault at the 1920 Summer Olympics.

References

1901 births
1980 deaths
Athletes (track and field) at the 1920 Summer Olympics
Swedish male pole vaulters
Olympic athletes of Sweden
Place of birth missing